Jose Colin Mendoza Bagaforo (born January 30, 1954) is the current bishop of the Roman Catholic Diocese of Kidapawan.

Biography
Jose Colin Mendoza Bagaforo was ordained a priest on March 25, 1980.

On February 2, 2006, Pope Benedict XVI appointed him Auxiliary Bishop of Cotabato and Titular Bishop of Vazari-Didda. He was consecrated bishop on April 25, 2006 by Orlando Beltran Quevedo, Archbishop of Cotobato. Co-consecrators were Fernando Capalla, Archbishop of Davao; and Angel Lagdameo, Archbishop of Jaro.

On July 25, 2016, Pope Francis appointed him as Bishop of Kidapawan.  He was installed as Bishop of Kidapawan on September 8, 2016.

References

1954 births
Living people
Bishops appointed by Pope Benedict XVI